Mamison Pass ([Mamysony æfcæg]) is a high mountainous pass in the central Greater Caucasus crest, on the Georgian-Russian border. It is crossed by the Ossetian Military Road, a highway that links Kutaisi (Georgia) with Alagir (North Ossetia, Russian Federation). Its peak is 2,911 m.

References 

 Map Mamison Pass K-38-40 (1988)
 “Mamison” in: The Columbia Encyclopedia, Sixth Edition, 2001-05: Columbia University Press.
 Meteostation photo

Roads in Georgia (country)
Geography of the Caucasus
Mountain passes of Georgia (country)
Mountain passes of Russia